Abu Bakarr Gaye (26 September 1951 in Barra – 2 December 2010 in Banjul) was a Gambian politician and the Minister of Health and Social Welfare of Gambia in 2009–2010.

Biography 
Abu Bakarr Gaye was born on September 26, 1951 in Barra. From 1960 to 1965, he attended Maburaki Secondary School in Sierra Leone. From 1967 to 1968, he studied in USSR at Patrice Lumumba University in Moscow. In 1973, Gaye received a doctorate in general medicine.

His professional career began in 1974 at the Ministry of Health of Sierra Leone. In 1977, he began working at Basse Hospital in Basse Santa Su. In 1979, he was appointed chief physician of Bansang Hospital in the village of Bansang and worked there until 1981. After that, until 1997, Gaye was engaged in private medical practice in Barra. Until 2004 he worked at Ahmadiy Hospital.

On 30 October 2009, Gaye was introduced by the President of the Republic of the Gambia, Yahya Jammeh, to the Gambian Cabinet of Ministers and was appointed Minister of Health and Social Affairs. He succeeded Mariatou Jallow.

Abu Bakarr Gaye had a profound knowledge in the field of tropical medicine, spoke fluent Russian, English and French. He was also fluent in several West African languages.

Abu Bakarr Gaye died on December 2, 2010 at Edward Francis Small Teaching Hospital.

References

1951 births
2010 deaths
Peoples' Friendship University of Russia alumni